Lucas Fernandes (born 24 April 1994) is a Brazilian footballer who plays for Hokkaido Consadole Sapporo as a right winger.

Club career
Born in União dos Palmares, Alagoas, Lucas Fernandes represented Real Deodorense, Vitória and CRB as a youth. He made his first team debut for the latter on 28 July 2013, coming on as a late substitute in a 2–0 home win against Luverdense for the Série C championship.

On 13 March 2014, Lucas Fernandes moved to Fluminense, being initially assigned to the under-20s. The following 25 February, he was loaned to Bonsucesso until the end of 2015 Campeonato Carioca.

Lucas Fernandes moved to Luverdense on 24 April 2015, on loan until December. He made his professional debut on 30 May, playing 17 minutes in a 1–2 home loss against Macaé Esporte.

Lucas Fernandes scored his first professional goal on 30 September 2015, netting the game's only in an away success over Ceará. In November, he renewed his contract with Flu.

On 7 January 2016, Lucas Fernandes joined Avaí in a one-year loan deal. After impressing with the side, he moved to Atlético Paranaense on 26 July.

Lucas Fernandes made his Série A debut on 30 July 2016, replacing Yago in a 0–2 away loss against Sport Recife.

References

External links
Atlético Paranaense profile 

1994 births
Living people
Sportspeople from Alagoas
Brazilian footballers
Association football forwards
Campeonato Brasileiro Série A players
Campeonato Brasileiro Série B players
Campeonato Brasileiro Série C players
J1 League players
Clube de Regatas Brasil players
Fluminense FC players
Bonsucesso Futebol Clube players
Luverdense Esporte Clube players
Avaí FC players
Club Athletico Paranaense players
Esporte Clube Vitória players
Hokkaido Consadole Sapporo players
Brazilian expatriate footballers
Expatriate footballers in Japan